Godwine or Godwin refers to the following people

 Godwin, Earl of Wessex (d. 1053) Earl of Wessex
 Godwine (floruit 995) (d. c. 1020) Bishop of Rochester
 Godwine (floruit 1013) (d. c. 1052) Bishop of Rochester